Cheloor Mana is situated at Peringottukara, near Thriprayar, Thrissur district, Kerala state, India. It is one among the famous ancestral homes of Namboodiris in Kerala. It is an "Ettu Kettu" having two internal courtyards (Nadumuttam). Cheloor Itti Ravi Namboodiri was a member of the first Cochin Legislative Assembly in 1925 in the Princely State Of Cochin Kingdom of Cochin . Along with Kaplingat Shankaran Namboodiri, he was instrumental in bringing out the 'Namboodiri Bill' which was intended to abolish polygamy among Namboodiris and aimed at many other revolutionary changes within the community. He was also one among the founders of Sree Kerala Varma College, Thrissur. He had also served as the receiver of the sitaram spinning and weaving mills ltd., trichur appointed by the high court of cochin in o.s. 2/1123 with effect from 2.7.1123 m.e. He was also a member of the Central War Committee of the state of Cochin during the Second World War. Mr A.F.W.Dixon, CIE. ICS the Dewan of the Cochin state, was the President of the Central War Committee.

Cheloor Mana is one among the three 'Ooralan' (Owner) families of Thriprayar Temple, the others being Janappilly Mana and Punnappilly Mana. Cheloor Mana has got its own family temple within the Mana premises called 'Cheloor Narayanan kulangara Maha Vishnu Temple'. Cheloor Mana possessed  of land in the late 1950s just before the Land Reforms Act was enforced in Kerala. 

Buildings and structures in Thrissur district